Commune II (Niamey), also known as Niamey II, is an urban commune in Niger. It is a commune of the capital city of Niamey.

References

External links

Commune 2